Borsuk (Polish for Badger) is an amphibious infantry fighting vehicle produced by Huta Stalowa Wola, a part of PGZ (Polish Armaments Group). It is designed to replace obsolete BWP-1 (Polish designation for BMP-1) IFV currently in service with the Polish Armed Forces.

Although often referred to as BWP Borsuk, BWP is not a part of the name but the Polish abbreviation for Bojowy Wóz Piechoty - Infantry Fighting Vehicle.

Development history  
The Borsuk IFV emerged from NBPWP Borsuk (Nowy Bojowy, Pływający Wóz Piechoty Borsuk - New Infantry Amphibious Fighting Vehicle Borsuk) development program initiated in October 2014, when a contract was signed between the NCBR and a consortium consisting of Huta Stalowa Wola S.A. (leader), Ośrodek Badawczo-Rozwojowy Urządzeń Mechanicznych OBRUM Sp. z o.o., Rosomak S.A., Wojskowe Zakłady Elektroniczne S.A., Wojskowe Zakłady Inżynieryjne S.A. (currently HSW), Wojskowe Zakłady Motoryzacyjne S.A., National Defense University (currently War Studies University), Military University of Technology, Wojskowy Instytut Techniki Pancernej i Samochodowej and Warsaw University of Technology aiming at the development of a new IFV. The value of the contract was 75 million PLN (22.6 USD). 62 million PLN  (18.68 million USD) was a grant from the NCBR.

The vehicle is equipped with the ZSSW-30 unmanned turret developed under its own program by a consortium of HSW and WB Group.

The first technology demonstrator of the new Borsuk IFV was unveiled at the MSPO 2017 exhibition with a more refined version being shown a year later. The 2018 variant differed from the original demonstrator by having side skirts, appliqué armor on the sides and composite rubber tracks (CRT) instead of steel link ones.

In 2018 the prototype underwent its first set of factory trials which resulted in introduction of additional upgrades. The new version presented in 2019 at MSPO exhibition had redesigned trim vane (it now rises from the top of the hull instead of the front as before), new headlights, different add-on armor and mounting points for mobile multispectral camouflage.

In September 2020 the prototype successfully completed a series of extensive military hands-on trials conducted at Drawsko Training Ground (including a set of firing tests). Preparation of the technical documentation of the vehicle for future production begun at the same time.

Construction of four additional prototypes was commissioned by NCBR in April 2022, which raised the development cost to 262.06 million PLN, of which 242.2 million PLN (58.7 and 54.3 million USD respectively at the exchange rate at that time) was financed by NCBR.

In November 2022 presentation and familiarization tests of Borsuk took place at the Orzysz Training Ground. They were witnessed by Polish Minister of National Defense Mariusz Błaszczak, HSW officials and the media. During the presentation it was announced that the qualification trials are expected to be completed by mid-2023 and that the 16th Mechanised Division will be the first recipient of the new vehicle. The same announcement also suggested that other types of ATGMs will be integrated with the ZSSW-30 turret and that the Borsuk's chassis will become a base for additional specialized vehicles.

On February 28, 2023, the Armaments Agency (the procurement agency of the Polish MoD) signed a framework agreement with Huta Stalowa Wola for the delivery of 1,000 Borsuk IFVs and 400 auxiliary variants based the same chassis. Among those variants are combat reconnnaissance vehicle, command vehicle, armored recovery vehicle, MEDEVAC vehicle, and NBC reconnnaissance vehicle. In this manner Borsuk will become a new fighting platform for the Polish Armed Forces and thus, in the Polish sources, is now often referred to as UMPG (Uniwersalna Modułowa Platforma Gąsienicowa - Universal Modular Tracked Platform, not to be confused with the Anders platform also referred to as UMPG).

Technical description

Mobility 
Borsuk is powered by a powerpack consisting of a 720 hp (530 kW) MTU 8V199 TE20 turbo diesel engine, which drives a six gear (four forward and two reverse gears) Perkins X300 automatic transmission. The running gear consists of six dual rubber-lined road wheels, with two return rollers on each side. The hydropneumatic suspension is designed specifically for the Borsuk and consists of six independent in-arm units on each side. Borsuk is able to use different type of tracks - it was presented on different occasions outfitted with steel tracks or composite rubber tracks (CRT).

The vehicle is fully amphibious without any special preparations - crossing a body of water only requires raising the trim vane (which can be done from the driver seat without the necessity of leaving the vehicle). In the water Borsuk is propelled by two water jets with rotating nozzles and steering capability.

The Borsuk's maximum speed is 65 km/h on the road and 8 km/h in the water. Its operational range is 550 km.

Armament

ZSSW-30 

Borsuk is fitted with the ZSSW-30 remote control turret armed with the 30 mm Mk44S Bushmaster II chain gun and a coaxial 7.62 mm UKM-2000C machine gun. The turret also features two Spike-LR anti-tank guided missiles in a launch container mounted on its right side. The ZSSW-30 provides around 300 autocannon rounds, including over 200 ABM rounds, and 250 machine gun rounds in ready to use mode. This is one of the biggest first stage ammunition racks when compared to other similar systems. 

Use of a separate ATGM launch container, as opposed to other systems where launcher extends directly from an internal compartment of the turret, has some advantages. Among those are separation of the missiles from the rest of the turret (and thus greater safety of the crew and the turret itself) and ability to quickly replace damaged or destroyed container while in the field. Both the autocannon and the machine gun can be reloaded and operated from the inside of the turret. The ATGMs can be reloaded from a hatch in the rear of the vehicle without the necessity for the crew to leave the vehicle (in the same manner as it is being done in the Bradley IFV.

The autocannon fires at a rate of 200 RPM for standard ammunition, and 120 RPM for ABM. It has elevation angles extending from -9° to +60°. The ATGMs can hit armour at ranges from 200 meters to 4 kilometers when guided manually, and up to 4.5 kilometers when in the fire and forget mode.

Protection

Chassis 
Borsuk's chassis is made out of welded Armox 500T steel plates of varying thickness arranged in such a way that they can function as spaced armor. This, according to official sources, gives the chassis STANAG 4569 level IV protection from the front and level III protection from the sides and the rear against ballistic threats, as well as level lIla and IIlb against mine blasts. Unofficial sources claim that Borsuk is even better armoured, with its chassis being able to stop Russian 30mm 3UBR6 and 3U8R8 rounds from the frontal arc (±30° from the centerline) and 12.7mm and 14.5mm from the sides. Even though the latter type may cause some damage the engine block.

Turret 
The level of armour protection of the ZSSW-30 turret is not disclosed by the manufacturer, but according to unofficial sources, the armour consists of a thin layer of polyethylene fabric sandwiched between two steel plates and an additional piece of ceramic composite armour (two steel plates with alumina tiles in between) on the ATGM container. This provides level III protection for both the main structure and the missile container. There is also level II protection for such external parts as the commanders sight.

Active protection 
In addition to armour, Borsuk is protected by the Obra-3 soft kill active protection system. This system consists of four laser detector sets (each one consisting of three detectors), a control unit and eight smoke grenade dischargers. The detectors work in 360° azimuth and in an elevation ranging from -6° to +30° and can detect light in the wavelength spectrum ranging from 0.6 to 11 µm as well as distinguish between different laser sources, such as laser rangefinders or target designators. Obra-3 can work in different modes: manual, semi-automatic and automatic. In the automatic mode the grenades are launched automatically into the specific path an incoming laser beam (immediately after the turret is rotated in this direction, which is also done automatically). The system uses GAk-81 phosphorus multispectral smoke grenades.

Situational awareness

Sights 
ZSSW-30 is equipped with the GOD-1 "Iris" sight for the commander and GOC-1 "Nike" sight for the gunner, both of which are integrated into the turret's fire control system and consist of a laser rangefinder as well as daytime and thermal optical channels. The commander's sight is mounted on top of the turret in an armored cover and provides 360° field of view with elevation angles from -20° to 60°, and the gunners sight provides elevation angles from -10° to 60° and is mounted on the left side of the turret and can be covered by an armored door. Both are equipped with an eye-safe laser rangefinder and two optical channels: daytime, with a light intensity sensor and thermal.

The turret is also fitted with an auxiliary optical sight which is not integrated with the FCS and is meant to be used in emergency situations from inside of the turret. It is located to the right of the gunners primary sight behind an armored cover.

Fire control system 
The ZSSW-30 fire control system made by WB Group provides full hunter-killer and killer-killer capabilities as well as superb accuracy when firing at moving targets from both moving and standing position. The fire control system allows for shooting in every position of the turret relative to the hull in all three axis (which is not a common feature for other comparable systems). The entire firing process is highly automated as both the gunner and the commander have an auto-tracker integrated into the FCS. The ZSSW-30 FCS is net-centric as it can transfer and coordinate information between different turrets as well as communicate with various types of UAVs. Both of those features greatly increase situational awareness and combat effectiveness of each and every vehicle.

See also 
 Rosomak
 T-15 Armata
 Kurganets-25
 Puma
 Tulpar
 M2 Bradley
 BMP-3
 ZBD-04
 Combat Vehicle 90
 BMD-4
 VPK-7829 Bumerang
 Makran

References 

Military equipment of Poland
Amphibious infantry fighting vehicles
Tracked infantry fighting vehicles
Infantry fighting vehicles of the post–Cold War period
Infantry fighting vehicles of Poland
Military vehicles of Poland